Roland Wilbur "Rowley, Rolly" Young (b. January 12, 1883 – d. March 21, 1961) was a Canadian professional ice hockey player active in the early 1900s. Amongst the teams he played for were the Cobalt Silver Kings, Pittsburgh Professionals, Toronto Professionals, Montreal Hockey Club and Berlin Dutchmen. Young played at the cover point position, equivalent to the modern day defenseman. He was born in Waterloo, Ontario.

In March 1908 Rowley Young played with the Toronto Professionals, champions of the OPHL, in a challenge game for the Stanley Cup against the Montreal Wanderers from the ECAHA. Despite two goals from star forward Newsy Lalonde Toronto lost the game 4-6 due to two late goals from Wanderers Moose Johnson and Bruce Stuart.

Awards and honours
OPHL Champion – 1907–08 with the Toronto Professionals.
OPHL First All-Star Team – 1907–08

References

Notes

1883 births
1961 deaths
Canadian ice hockey defencemen
Cobalt Silver Kings players
Ice hockey people from Ontario
Sportspeople from Waterloo, Ontario
Pittsburgh Professionals players